Parmjit Singh may refer to any one of several notable people:

Parmjit Singh Gill, British Liberal Democrat politician
Parmjit Singh Dhanda, British Labour Party politician
Parmjit Singh "Peter" Sandu, Canadian politician
Parmjit Singh, British lawyer

See also 
Paramjit Singh (disambiguation)